Samar Quadri (born 27 July 1989) is an Indian cricketer who plays for Bihar. He made his first-class debut for Jharkhand against Assam on 17 November 2009 in 2009-10 Ranji Trophy. He made his List A debut on 3 March 2014, for Jharkhand in the 2013–14 Vijay Hazare Trophy.

References

External links
 

1989 births
Living people
Indian cricketers
Bihar cricketers
Jharkhand cricketers
Cricketers from Patna